Monika Bolly (born 1 February 1968 in Oleśnica) is a Polish actress.

Selected filmography 
1990: Escape from the 'Liberty' Cinema
1994: Zawrócony
1995: Prowokator
1997: Lata i dni
1998-1999: Życie jak poker
2002-2008: Samo Życie
2005: Pierwsza miłość
2006: Hela w opałach
2012: Ja to mam szczęście!
2014: True Law
2016: Na Wspólnej
2018: Ślad

External links 
Monika Bolly at filmpolski.pl

Polish actresses
1968 births
Living people